Statistics of Swedish football Division 2 for the 1968 season.

League standings

Norrland

Svealand

Norra Götaland

Södra Götaland

Allsvenskan promotion playoffs

References
Sweden - List of final tables (Clas Glenning)

Swedish Football Division 2 seasons
2
Sweden
Sweden